ACFS may refer to:

 ASM Cluster File System, in computing
 Advisory Council of Faculty Senates, Florida, US

See also
 ACF (disambiguation)